Albert Chan Wai-yip  (born 3 March 1955, Hong Kong), also known by his nickname "Big Piece", is a former member of the Legislative Council of Hong Kong representing the New Territories West constituency. He has served as a legislator from 1991 to 2016 except for the periods 1997–2000 and Jan–May 2010. Chan, formerly a social worker, was a member of the Tsuen Wan District Council.

Political career
In 1986, together with Lee Wing-tat, he founded the Hong Kong Association for Democracy and People's Livelihood. From 1994–2002 he was a member of the Democratic Party. In 2006 he co-founded the League of Social Democrats but resigned in 2011 over differences with the then leadership to form People Power with fellow legislator Wong Yuk-man. He is active in grass roots issues and believes that the government is not genuinely committed to the electoral reform promised in the Hong Kong Basic Law.

2010 Five Constituencies Referendum
On 29 January 2010, Chan, together with four other lawmakers (two from Civic Party, two from LSD) Alan Leong, Tanya Chan, Leung Kwok-hung and Wong Yuk-man, resigned their seats in the Legislative Council. They intended that the popular vote in the by-elections triggered by their resignations would act as a de facto referendum on electoral reform, pressing the PRC Government into allowing universal suffrage in Hong Kong in compliance with Hong Kong's constitution, the Basic Law. On 16 May 2010, he was re-elected as a lawmaker in the by-election.

People Power
In January 2011, Chan and fellow legislator Wong Yuk-man resigned from the League of Social Democrats over differences with the leadership over what stance to take towards the Democratic Party in the discussions over Hong Kong's political development. The move left the party and its remaining legislator, Leung Kwok-hung ('Long Hair') in a difficult position. They also said that factional fighting within the party has become so hostile that it was beyond their ability to rectify the situation.

With Wong, he went on to launch People Power, under which name he continues to sit in Legco. In 2011 regional elections, he went against Tuen Mun Lok tsui Constituency's candidate Albert Ho Chun-yan, the then-chairman of Democratic Party. However, he was defeated. In 2012 legislative elections, Chan was reelected for a seventh time. He chose to make way for the youngster in the 2016 Legislative Council election, standing as a second candidate of Wong Ho-ming of its ally League of Social Democrats under the banner of "radical democrats". The list received 28,529 votes and failed to retain the seat.

References

External links
 Legco biography
 Official website

1955 births
Living people
Hong Kong social workers
Hong Kong Christians
University of Manitoba alumni
University of British Columbia alumni
Charter 08 signatories
Hong Kong Association for Democracy and People's Livelihood politicians
Democratic Party (Hong Kong) politicians
League of Social Democrats politicians
People Power (Hong Kong) politicians
United Democrats of Hong Kong politicians
District councillors of Tsuen Wan District
Members of the Regional Council of Hong Kong
HK LegCo Members 1991–1995
HK LegCo Members 1995–1997
HK LegCo Members 2000–2004
HK LegCo Members 2004–2008
HK LegCo Members 2008–2012
HK LegCo Members 2012–2016